Lincoln Township is the name of some places in the U.S. state of Minnesota:
Lincoln Township, Blue Earth County, Minnesota
Lincoln Township, Marshall County, Minnesota

See also
Lincoln Township (disambiguation)

Minnesota township disambiguation pages